Padalište is a village in the municipality of Gostivar, North Macedonia.

Demographics
As of the 2021 census, Padalište had 287 residents with the following ethnic composition:
Albanians 251
Persons for whom data are taken from administrative sources 34
Others 2

According to the 2002 census, the village had a total of 721 inhabitants. Ethnic groups in the village include:

Albanians 717
Turks 1
Others 3

References

External links

Villages in Gostivar Municipality
Albanian communities in North Macedonia